Alexandra Stréliski is a Canadian neo-classical composer and pianist based in Quebec. She has released two albums: Pianoscope (2010) and Inscape (2018).

Early life
Stréliski was born in Montreal, Quebec and is of Polish Jewish descent. After living a few years in Paris, she returned to Montréal where she studied at Collège international Marie de France, McGill University and Université de Montréal.

Career
Stréliski released her debut album, Pianoscope, in 2010. Songs from the album have appeared in several films and movies, specifically those by Canadian director Jean-Marc Vallée. This includes the Dallas Buyers Club, Demolition,  and Big Little Lies. She collaborated with Vallée to create new compositions for the HBO miniseries, Sharp Objects.

Her sophomore album, Inscape, was released in 2018; it was long-listed for the 2019 Polaris Music Prize. Inscape was the number one classical album on Apple Music at the end of 2018 in the United States and two of the tracks have reached over 20 million streams on Spotify. It was named number 9 on Exclaim's Top 10 Experimental & Modern Composition Albums released in 2018. In December 2019, she received two Felix Awards for "Author or Composer of the Year" and "Revelation of the Year". She was nominated for three awards at the 2020 Juno Awards, for Album of the Year, Breakthrough Artist of the Year, and Instrumental Album of the Year.

References 

1985 births
Living people
Canadian classical composers
Canadian women pianists
Musicians from Montreal
Women classical pianists
Juno Award for Instrumental Album of the Year winners
Félix Award winners
21st-century Canadian composers
21st-century women composers
21st-century classical pianists
21st-century classical composers
Canadian women composers
21st-century Canadian women musicians
21st-century Canadian pianists
21st-century women pianists